Martin "Marty" Aspinwall (born 21 October 1981), also known by the nicknames of "Aspy", and "Awol", is an English rugby league footballer who plays as a  for the Barrow Raiders in Betfred League 1.

He played as a er and  earlier in his career, playing in the Super League for the Wigan Warriors (Heritage № 942), the Huddersfield Giants, the Castleford Tigers (Heritage № 914) and Hull F.C.

Career
Born in Wigan, Aspinwall started his career with hometown club Wigan as a top junior and was the first player to be signed onto their now pioneering scholarship scheme that was set up by Brian Foley and Dean Bell. On 8 July 2001, he made his début against Huddersfield at 19 years old and made six further substitute appearances in the same season. The 2002 Super League season proved to be a break-through year for him, as several injuries in the backs left the way open for him to establish himself in the first team. He played in at centre and wing during Wigan's league run-in and during the playoff series. Before the St. Helens Final Elimination clash, Aspinwall commented, "My goal at the beginning of the season was to get eight to ten games, maybe come off the bench, but because of the injury crisis that we've had, especially in the backs, I've found myself in the Semis now and one game away from a Grand Final.”

Coach Stuart Raper played Aspinwall alongside several other up and coming youngsters during the 2002's Super League VII. "It's quite exciting for me to be able to play these guys," said Raper. Aspinwall continued his good form for the club and, in July 2003, signed a new two-year contract with the club, turning down strong interest from Warrington.

Aspinwall was selected for the England A squad to face New Zealand at Brentford in November 2002 but had to withdraw due to a viral illness. In 2003, he played and scored a try for England A in a 22–26 defeat against Australia, and made a further two appearances against Wales and France in the 2003 European Nations Cup. He was also picked to represent Lancashire in the 2003 Origin match.

Aspinwall became a first team regular in the next two years, and played for Wigan at centre in the 2003 Super League Grand Final which was lost to Bradford Bulls.

At the end of his contract, which ran out in October 2005, Wigan allowed Martin to become a free-agent. He had made 107 competitive appearances for Wigan, scoring 24 tries. He quickly signed for Super League rivals Huddersfield, where he played in the 2006 Challenge Cup Final defeat by St. Helens at Twickenham. He was also Giants top try scorer in his first season with 15.

In October 2006, Aspinwall was named in the 25-man Great Britain Tri-Nations squad to tour Australia and New Zealand. His 2007 season was cut short in July when he suffered an horrific cruciate knee injury against Warrington, ruling him potentially 12 months on the sidelines.

However he made a very speedy recovery and has been named in the England training squad for the 2008 Rugby League World Cup.

Aspinwall was not offered an extension to his contract beyond the end of 2010, and linked up with Super League side Castleford. In June 2011, Aspinwall was jailed for four months for dangerous driving. After serving his sentence, he moved to Hull F.C. for the 2012 season, and played 27 games for the club before signing a one-year contract with Leigh at the end of the season. Aspinwall played till the end of the 2014–2015 season with Leigh before being released.

For the start of the 2016 season Aspinwall signed for Barrow Raiders one a one-year deal with the option of a second.

References

External links

 Statistics at wigan.rlfans.com

Statistics at hullfc.com

1981 births
Living people
Barrow Raiders players
Castleford Tigers players
English rugby league players
Huddersfield Giants players
Hull F.C. players
Lancashire rugby league team players
Leigh Leopards players
Rugby league wingers
Rugby league players from Wigan
Wigan Warriors players